In Greek mythology, Hippolyte (/hɪˈpɒlɪtə/; Ancient Greek: Ἱππολύτη) or Hippolyta was the name of the following characters:

Hippolyte, one of the Hesperides and sister of Mapsaura and Thetis.
Hippolyte, queen of the Amazons.
 Hippolyte, also called Astydameia, queen of Iolcus and wife of Acastus. She was described as the opulent daughter of Cretheus.
 Hippolyte, nurse of Smyrna (Myrrha).
 Hippolyte, an Olenian princess as the daughter of King Dexamenus, and the sister of Eurypylus, Theronice and Theraephone. In some accounts, she was also known as Mnesimache or Deianira. Hippolyte was threatened violence by the centaur Eurytion during her wedding feast (she having married Azan); Heracles, who was also attending the feast, killed him and rescued her.
 Hippolyte, possible name for the mother of Epistrophus and Schedius

See also 

 Hippolyte (disambiguation)

Notes

References 

Antoninus Liberalis, The Metamorphoses of Antoninus Liberalis translated by Francis Celoria (Routledge 1992). Online version at the Topos Text Project.
Apollodorus, The Library with an English Translation by Sir James George Frazer, F.B.A., F.R.S. in 2 Volumes, Cambridge, MA, Harvard University Press; London, William Heinemann Ltd. 1921. ISBN 0-674-99135-4. Online version at the Perseus Digital Library. Greek text available from the same website.
Diodorus Siculus, The Library of History translated by Charles Henry Oldfather. Twelve volumes. Loeb Classical Library. Cambridge, Massachusetts: Harvard University Press; London: William Heinemann, Ltd. 1989. Vol. 3. Books 4.59–8. Online version at Bill Thayer's Web Site
Diodorus Siculus, Bibliotheca Historica. Vol 1-2. Immanel Bekker. Ludwig Dindorf. Friedrich Vogel. in aedibus B. G. Teubneri. Leipzig. 1888–1890. Greek text available at the Perseus Digital Library.
Gaius Julius Hyginus, Fabulae from The Myths of Hyginus translated and edited by Mary Grant. University of Kansas Publications in Humanistic Studies. Online version at the Topos Text Project.
Pausanias, Description of Greece with an English Translation by W.H.S. Jones, Litt.D., and H.A. Ormerod, M.A., in 4 Volumes. Cambridge, MA, Harvard University Press; London, William Heinemann Ltd. 1918. . Online version at the Perseus Digital Library
Pausanias, Graeciae Descriptio. 3 vols. Leipzig, Teubner. 1903.  Greek text available at the Perseus Digital Library.
Pindar, Odes translated by Diane Arnson Svarlien. 1990. Online version at the Perseus Digital Library.
 Pindar, The Odes of Pindar including the Principal Fragments with an Introduction and an English Translation by Sir John Sandys, Litt.D., FBA. Cambridge, MA., Harvard University Press; London, William Heinemann Ltd. 1937. Greek text available at the Perseus Digital Library.

Queens of the Amazons
Hesperides
Princesses in Greek mythology
Aetolian characters in Greek mythology
Characters from Iolcus
Mythology of Heracles